The Samsung Galaxy F42 5G is Samsung Electronics' smartphone announced by Samsung Electronics. The phone has a triple-camera setup with a 64 MP main camera, a 6.6 inches HD+ Infinity-V display, and a 5000 mAh Li-Po battery. It ships with Android 11.

References 

Samsung Galaxy
Mobile phones introduced in 2021
Android (operating system) devices
Samsung smartphones
Mobile phones with multiple rear cameras